Leptotes tenuis is a species of orchid endemic to Brazil.

References

External links 

tenuis
Endemic orchids of Brazil